Sean McAllister (born 2 May 1965) is a British documentary filmmaker.

Filmography 
 Flyingdales (1988) – Frontier Films
 Toxic Waste (1988) – Frontier Films
 Hessle Road (1988) – Frontier Films
 A Passing Thought (1989) – Frontier Films
 The Season (1990) – Homemade Films
 Crematorium (1993) – NFTS
 Life with Brian (1994) – NFTS
 Hitting (1995) – NFTS
 Just People  (1995 / 1998) – NFTS / Channel 4
 Shoot out in Swansea  (1997) – Vagabond Films / BBC
 Working for the Enemy (1997) – Mosaic Films / BBC2
 The Minders (1998) – BBC Modern Times
 Settlers (2000) – Channel 4 True Stories
 Hull's Angel (2002) – Channel 4 True Stories
 The Liberace of Baghdad (2004) – Tenfoot Films
 Japan: A Story of Love and Hate (2008) – Tenfoot Films
 The Reluctant Revolutionary (2012) – Tenfoot Films
 A Syrian Love Story (2014) – Tenfoot Films
 A Northern Soul (2018) – Tenfoot Films

Awards 
 Winner, Special Jury Prize, Sundance Film Festival 2005
 Winner, Best Ethnographic/Anthropological Film Boulder International Film Festival
 Special Jury Prize, Chicago International Documentary Festival
 Winner, Special award for the most valuable film on refugees, Cinema for Peace Foundation

See also 
Lists of directors and producers of documentaries

References

External links 
 
 
 "McAllister unhinges the nail that sticks out sorely – a review of Japan: A Story of Love and Hate" by Rebecca Frankel, Channel Four, Four Docs, 12 November 2008. retrieved 15 November 2008
Japan: A Story of Love and Hate by The Passionate Eye for CBC

1965 births
Living people
English documentary filmmakers
Alumni of the National Film and Television School
Film producers from Kingston upon Hull